Eucalyptus stricta, commonly known as Blue Mountains mallee ash, is a mallee that is endemic to eastern New South Wales. It has smooth, mottled bark, often with insect scribbles, linear to lance-shaped adult leaves, flower buds in groups of seven, white flowers and urn-shaped to barrel-shaped fruit.

Description
It has smooth, mottled pale grey brown and pink bark, often with insect scribbles. Flowering has been observed in most months and the flowers are white.

Taxonomy and naming
Eucalyptus stricta was first formally described in 1827 by Kurt Polycarp Joachim Sprengel from an unpublished description by Franz Sieber. Sprengel's description was published in his book Systema Vegetabilium. The specific epithet (stricta) is from the Latin strictus meaning"drawn together", "upright" or "straight", possibly referring to the many stems of this mallee.

Distribution and habitat
Blue Mountains mallee ash has a scattered distribution from the Central Coast and through the Blue Mountains to the Budawangs and is locally common. It grows in heath and shrubland in shallow, sandy soils on plateaus and ridge-tops.

References 

stricta
Myrtales of Australia
Flora of New South Wales
Mallees (habit)
Plants described in 1827